This is a list of American sportspeople of Filipino ancestry.

Baseball

 Benny Agbayani – outfielder
 Chris Aguila – outfielder 
 John André – pitcher
 Bobby Balcena – outfielder
 Jason Bartlett – shortstop 
 Bobby Chouinard – pitcher
 Chase d'Arnaud – shortstop
 Travis d'Arnaud – catcher
 Geno Espineli – pitcher
 Tim Lincecum – pitcher
 Kyle Lohse – pitcher
 Clay Rapada – pitcher
 Addison Russell – infielder 
 Tyler Saladino – shortstop
 Brandon Villafuerte – pitcher
 Jordan Yamamoto – pitcher

Basketball

 Jimmy Alapag – former Talk 'N Text Tropang Texters and Gilas Pilipinas guard. Former Head coach of San Miguel Alab Pilipinas of the ASEAN Basketball League.
 Chris Banchero – guard for the Alaska Aces & Magnolia Hotshots of the Philippine Basketball Association.
 Nic Belasco – 8–time PBA Champion.
 Jason Brickman – guard for the Mono Vampire of the ASEAN Basketball League and for Kaohsiung Aquas of the Taiwanese T1 League. Played college basketball for LIU Brooklyn.
 Noy Castillo – 3–time PBA All-Star.
 Jeffrey Cariaso – retired professional basketball player and former Alaska Aces shooting guard.
 Jordan Clarkson – guard for the Utah Jazz. Represented the Philippines in international competition as part of Gilas Pilipinas.
 Mike Cortez – retired guard for the Blackwater Elite, Meralco Bolts, NorthPort Batang Pier & Air21 Express of the Philippine Basketball Association.
 Aaron Craft – guard for the Aquila Basket Trento of the Lega Basket Serie A. Played college basketball for the Ohio State Buckeyes and also played for the Santa Cruz Warriors of the NBA G League.
 Joe Devance – Retired PBA player; last played for the Barangay Ginebra San Miguel of the Philippine Basketball Association.
 Michael DiGregorio – guard for the Blackwater Bossing of the Philippine Basketball Association.
 Jared Dillinger – guard/forward for the Barangay Ginebra San Miguel of the Philippine Basketball Association.
 Chris Ellis - 3-time PBA All-Star and PBA Slam Dunk Champion (2013).
 Simon Enciso – guard for the Alaska Aces of the Philippine Basketball Association. Played Division II basketball for Notre Dame de Namur.
 Matt Ganuelas-Rosser – forward for the San Miguel Beermen small forward of the Philippine Basketball Association. Played Division II basketball for Cal Poly Pomona.
 Jalen Green – guard for the Houston Rockets. FIBA Under-17 Basketball World Cup MVP representing the United States in 2018.
 Davonn Harp –  2-time PBA Commissioner's Cup Champion.
 Brian Heruela – guard for the San Miguel Beermen of the Philippine Basketball Association.
 Ron Harper Jr. - guard/forward for the Toronto Raptors.
 Michael Holper – PBA Champion.
 Isaac Holstein – 3-time PBA Champion.
 Marcio Lassiter – guard for the San Miguel Beermen of the Philippine Basketball Association. Played college basketball for Cal State Fullerton.
 Chris Lutz – 3-time PBA Champion. PBA All-Star.
 Rashawn McCarthy – guard for the Terrafirma Dyip of the Philippine Basketball Association.
 Eric Menk – PBA MVP. Also a two-time member of the Philippine national basketball team.
 Sol Mercado – guard for the Barangay Ginebra San Miguel of the Philippine Basketball Association.
 Kelly Nabong – forward/center for the San Miguel Beermen of the Philippine Basketball Association.
 Chris Newsome – guard for the Meralco Bolts of the Philippine Basketball Association.
 Gabe Norwood – guard/forward for the Rain or Shine Elasto Painters of the Philippine Basketball Association. Played college basketball for the George Mason Patriots and also represented the Philippines in FIBA sanctioned and international competition as part of Gilas Pilipinas.
 Jason Perkins – forward for the Phoenix Pulse Fuel Masters of the Philippine Basketball Association.
 Hernando Planells – basketball coach.
 Stanley Pringle – guard for Barangay Ginebra San Miguel of the Philippine Basketball Association. Represented the Philippines in international competition as part of Gilas Pilipinas.
 Chris Ross – guard for the San Miguel Beermen of the Philippine Basketball Association.
 Andy Seigle – a two-time member of the Philippine national basketball team.
 Danny Seigle – 8–time PBA Champion. A two-time member of the Philippine national basketball team.
 Greg Slaughter – center for the Barangay Ginebra San Miguel of the Philippine Basketball Association.
 Erik Spoelstra – head coach of the Miami Heat.
 Raymond Townsend – UCLA Bruins and Golden State Warriors guard
 Moala Tautuaa – American born with Filipino and Tongan descent. Center/forward for the NorthPort Batang Pier of the Philippine Basketball Association.
 Josh Urbiztondo – PBA Champion and PBA All–Star.
 Jay Washington – forward for the Rain or Shine Elasto Painters of the Philippine Basketball Association and for Ryukyu Golden Kings & Yokohama Excellence of Japan B.League. Played Division II basketball for Eckerd College.
 Kelly Williams – forward/center for the TNT KaTropa of the Philippine Basketball Association.

Chess
 Wesley So - chess grandmaster, born Filipino with Chinese descent.

Combat Sports/Martial Arts

 Romie Adanza – kickboxer
 Chris Cariaso – mixed martial artist, fought in the UFC
 Arianny Celeste – UFC octagon girl and model
 John Dodson – Mixed martial artist, fought in the UFC. Ultimate Fighter 14 winner. 
 Glenn Donaire – Nonito Donaire's older brother, also a boxer in the flyweight and junior flyweight classes.
 Nonito Donaire – Four-Division Boxing World Champion (112 lbs, 118 lbs, 122 lbs and 126 lbs.)
 Adriano Directo Emperado – one of five martial artists who developed the Kajukenbo self-defense system
 Andrew Ganigan – former boxing lightweight contender.
 Dan Inosanto – Head of Bruce Lee's JKD, Head of Lacoste / Inosanto FMA.
 Tito Jones – mixed martial artist
 Ana Julaton – Boxer
 Robbie Lawler – mixed martial artist, UFC Welterweight Champion. Lawler is a quarter Filipino through his mother's side. 
 Troy Mandaloniz – mixed martial artist, fought in the UFC
 Paige McPherson – 2012 Summer Olympics Taekwondo bronze medalist 
 Yancy Medeiros – mixed martial artist, fought in the UFC
 Mark Muñoz – mixed martial artist, fought in the UFC
 Phillipe Nover – mixed martial artist, fought in the UFC

 Jesus Salud - 1989 WBA super bantamweight champion
 Ricky Turcios - mixed martial artist, fought in the UFC
 Elena Reid - professional boxer and mixed martial artist
 Shane Del Rosario – mixed martial artist, fought in the UFC
 Brandon Vera – mixed martial artist, fought in the UFC
 Brian Viloria – US Olympic boxer, former WBC light-flyweight champion
 Ernie Reyes Jr. – martial artist
 Ernie Reyes, Sr. – martial artist
 Eddie Abasolo – professional muay thai fighter

Cycling, Road, BMX, and Track

 Coryn Rivera – professional USA women's racing cyclist (Team Sunweb)
 Daniel Caluag – 2012 Summer Olympics BMX Cyclist from Philippines Team

Fencing

 Lee Kiefer – US olympic fencing team

Figure Skating

 Amanda Evora – U.S. Olympic figure skater (pairs/ice dancing)
 Tai Babilonia – Olympic figure skater (African American mother; Filipino and Hopi-Indian father)
Christopher Caluza– 2013 Lombardia Trophy silver medalist
 Elizabeth Punsalan – U.S. Olympic figure skater (pairs/ice dancing) (Filipino father)
 Kristine Musademba – U.S. figure skater (Filipino mother)

Hockey

 Mathew Dumba - Minnesota Wild defensemen National Hockey League (Filipina mother)
 Jason Robertson (ice hockey) - Dallas Stars left wing National Hockey League (Filipina mother)
 Nicholas Robertson (ice hockey) - Toronto Maple Leafs left wing National Hockey League (Filipina mother)

American Football

 Tyler Allgeier – running back for the Atlanta Falcons.
 Eugene Amano – former NFL offensive guard/center.
 Doug Baldwin – former NFL wide receiver who spent his entire career with the Seattle Seahawks.
 Tedy Bruschi – former NFL All-Pro linebacker, New England Patriots.
 Camryn Bynum – strong safety for the Minnesota Vikings.
 Matt Castelo – former linebacker, San Jose State Spartans.
 Jordon Dizon – former NFL linebacker, Detroit Lions.
 Aaron Francisco – former NFL safety.
 Roman Gabriel – former NFL quarterback, Los Angeles Rams.
 Chris Gocong – former NFL linebacker who split his 6 years in the NFL with the Philadelphia Eagles and the Cleveland Browns.
 Keith Ismael – center for the San Francisco 49ers.
 Josh Jacobs – running back for the Las Vegas Raiders.
 Jordan Norwood – former NFL wide receiver and punt returner, he set a Super Bowl record for the longest punt return at 61 yards while playing for the Denver Broncos who won Super Bowl 50.
 Chris Rix – former quarterback, Florida State Seminoles.
 Steve Slaton – former NFL running back.
 Curtis Weaver – XFL defensive end. Formerly played for the Cleveland Browns.

Golf
J.J. Spaun – professional golfer, PGA Tour
Dorothy Delasin – professional golfer, LPGA
Jennifer Rosales – professional golfer, LPGA

Gymnastics
 Kyla Ross – member of the Fierce Five, the gold medal-winning US Women's Gymnastics team at the 2012 Summer Olympics.
 Ava Verdeflor – Philippines national team member training in Allen, Texas. 2014 Youth Olympics competitor.
 Aleah Finnegan – She represented the Philippines and make her debut at the postponed 2021 Southeast Asian Games where she won 2 gold medals and 2 silver medals.

Poker

 Noli Francisco
 Toto Leonidas

Skateboarding

 Henry Gutierrez – professional vert skateboarder
 Sean Malto – professional skateboarder
 Pat Ngoho – professional vert skateboarder/artist
 Lizzie Armanto – professional vert skateboarder
 Adrian Demain – professional vert skateboarder/artist
 Willy Santos – professional skateboarder
 Sergie Ventura – professional vert skateboarder
 Doug Saladino – professional vert skateboarder

Football/Soccer

 Joshua Alcala – American born Hispanic/Filipino soccer player.  Has played in the United States Soccer Leagues D1 & D2.
 Henry Brauner – has played in the USL Premier Development League and the Philippines national team.
 Heather Cooke has played for the Philippine women's national football team.
 Jonathan de Guzman, soccer player in the Eredivisie and member of the Dutch men's national soccer team. Canadian born, with a Filipino mother and Jamaican father.
 Julian de Guzman, former member of the Canadian men's national soccer team, Filipino mother and Jamaican father.
 Anton del Rosario – American born.  Played NCAA soccer for Skyline College, Notre Dame de Namur University, and Philippine national football team.
 Natasha Kai – American soccer player and member of the United States women's national soccer team.
 Nick Rimando – Filipino, Mexican American soccer player who currently plays for Real Salt Lake in Major League Soccer.
 Tiffany Roberts – American soccer player and former member of the United States Women's National Soccer Team (Filipina mother).
 Alphonse Areola – France national football team & Paris Saint-Germain F.C. soccer player on loan playing at West Ham United F.C., both parents are Filipino.
 David Alaba – Austria national football team and Real Madrid CF soccer player, Filipina mother and Nigerian father.
 Sarina Bolden – member of the Philippine women's national football team
 Olivia McDaniel – member of the Philippine women's national football team
 Kiara Fontanilla – member of the Philippine women's national football team
 Dominique Randle – member of the Philippine women's national football team
 Tahnai Annis – team captain & member of the Philippine women's national football team
 Quinley Quezada – member of the Philippine women's national football team
 Katrina Guillou – member of the Philippine women's national football team
 Hali Long – member of the Philippine women's national football team
 Eva Madarang – member of the Philippine women's national football team
 Maya Alcantara – member of the Philippine women's national football team
 Sofia Harrison – member of the Philippine women's national football team
 Reina Bonta – member of the Philippine women's national football team
 Alicia Barker – member of the Philippine women's national football team
 Isabella Flanigan – member of the Philippine women's national football team
 Jessica Miclat – member of the Philippine women's national football team

Speed Skating

 J.R. Celski – 2014 Winter Olympics silver medalist & 2010 Winter Olympics bronze medalist for short track speed skating. and five-time world champion medalist.

Track & Field

 Rene Herrera
 Eric Cray
 Trenten Beram
 Kristina Knott

Table Tennis

 Angelita Rosal – Four times U.S. National Table Tennis champion.

Tennis

 Cecil Mamiit
 Treat Conrad Huey
 Lilia Osterloh
 Eric Taino
 Riza Zalameda

Volleyball

 Liz Masakayan – Professional beach volleyball player.
 David McKienzie – member of US national team.

Water Sports

 Victoria Manalo Draves – diver who was the first Asian American gold medalist, and first woman to win two gold medals in springboard diving at the 1948 Olympics in London.
 Sunny Garcia – surfing world champion, surfing legend.
 Malia Jones – surfing model, People Magazine's 50 Most Beautiful People.
 Natalie Coughlin – International swimmer and twelve-time Olympic medalist (with Filipino ancestry)
Nicole Oliva - swimmer
 Henley Masa – surfing world champion, WSL U.S. Open Champion

Wrestling

 David Bautista –  former professional mixed martial artist, and former professional wrestler best known for his time in the WWE under the ring name Batista. He is a six-time world champion, winning the World Heavyweight Championship four times and the WWE Championship twice.
 Michael Paris – better known as DJZ for his time with TNA Wrestling. Currently signed with WWE where he performs on the NXT brand under the ring name Joaquin Wilde.
 Benny Cuntapay – also known by his ring alias B-Boy. Performer in CZW or Combat Zone Wrestling, also wrestled as Bael in Lucha Underground but was killed off in a storyline angle.
 T. J. Perkins – best known as the Inaugural WWE Cruiserweight Champion. Performed in WWE's Raw brand under the name TJ Perkins. Also a former wrestler for TNA Wrestling formerly known as Suicide. Perkins is also known by his ring aliases Pinoy Boy and Puma.
 Kris Hernandez – better known by the ring name Kris Wolf
 Ashley Louise Urbanski – currently signed with WWE where she performs on the NXT under the ring name, Shotzi Blackheart.
 Allyssa Lyn "Lacey" Lane – currently signed to WWE here she performs on the NXT under the ring name Kayden Carter.
 Jeff Cobb – better known for his time with NJPW, Ring of Honor, and All Elite Wrestling. Currently signed with NJPW where he belongs with the United Empire Faction. Cobb was formerly Never Openweight Champion, ROH tag team Champion, and PWG World Champion.

References

American
Lists of American sportspeople